Calame is a surname. Notable people with the surname include:

Alexandre Calame (1810–1864), Swiss painter
André Calame, Swiss figure skater
Byron Calame (born 1939), American journalist
Claude Calame (born 1943), Swiss writer on Greek mythology
Geneviève Calame (1946–1993), Swiss pianist, music educator and composer
Ingrid Calame (born 1965), American artist
Marie-Anne Calame (1775-1834), Swiss Vitreous enamel miniaturist and pietist philanthropist educator